Duke of Vila Real (in Portuguese Duque de Vila Real) was a Portuguese title of nobility created by royal decree, dated from February 28, 1585, by King Philip I of Portugal (also known as Philip II of Spain), and granted to Dom Manuel de Menezes, 5th Marquis of Vila Real and 7th Count of Vila Real.

The title was granted by the King in one life, to the 5th Marquis of Vila Real, due his personal support to the Spanish Habsburgs during the 1580 Portuguese succession crisis.

List of the Dukes of Vila Real
Manuel de Menezes, Duke of Vila Real (1530- ? ), also known as Manuel of Meneses, 5th Marquis of Vila Real and 7th Count of Vila Real.

See also
Marquis of Vila Real
Duke of Caminha
Count of Vila Real
Count of Alcoutim
List of Portuguese Dukedoms

External links
 Genealogy of the Duke of Vila Real

Bibliography
”Nobreza de Portugal e do Brasil" – Vol. III, pages 523/528. Published by Zairol Lda., Lisbon 1989. 

 
Vila Real
Vila Real
1585 establishments in Portugal

pt:Duque de Vila Real